Chiri Chiri is the debut Japanese studio album by South Korean girl group Momoland. It was released by King Records on September 4, 2019. The album features the group's Japanese singles – "Bboom Bboom", "Baam", "I'm So Hot" and "Pinky Love"; along with the Japanese versions of Momoland's previously released songs and the new track "Chiri Chiri".

Commercially, the album peaked at number thirty on Japan's Oricon Albums Chart.

Singles
The Japanese version of "Bboom Bboom" was released on June 13, 2018 by King Records. It was followed by "Baam" which was released on November 7, 2018. The third single "I'm So Hot" was released on May 7, 2019.

The first three Japanese singles of the group peaked on Oricon Singles Chart at number four, eight and eight respectively. The singles also peaked on the Billboard Japan Hot 100 at number nine, twelve and fifty-one respectively.

To coincide the release of their debut Japanese studio album, "Pinky Love" was released as a single in September 2019. The music video for the song was released on September 2, 2019. While the dance practice video was uploaded on June 29, 2020.

Commercial performance
In Japan, the studio album debuted and peaked at number thirty on the Oricon Albums Chart. It sold 1,669 physical copies. Chiri Chiri also charted on the Billboard Hot Albums at number forty-nine.

Track listing

Charts

Release history

References

Momoland albums
2019 albums
Japanese-language albums